Liu Zhurun (born 6 October 2001) is a Chinese professional footballer currently playing as a forward for Chinese Super League club Shanghai Port.

Club career
Liu made his professional debut on 4 December 2020 in a 2-0 defeat against Jeonbuk Hyundai Motors in the 2020 AFC Champions League group stage. On 11 May 2021, Liu made his Chinese Super League debut in a 0-0 draw against Changchun Yatai. He scored his first goal for the club on 24 October 2021 in a 3-0 win against Dalian Professional in the first leg of the 2021 Chinese FA Cup quarter-final, and he finished the 2021 season with 5 goals, 2 of them in the league and 3 in the Chinese FA Cup.

International career
On 20 July 2022, Liu made his international debut in a 3-0 defeat against South Korea in the 2022 EAFF E-1 Football Championship, as the Chinese FA decided to field the U-23 national team for this senior competition.

Career statistics

Club
.

References

2001 births
 Living people
 People from Fuyang
Chinese footballers
 China youth international footballers
 Association football forwards
 Chinese Super League players
 Shanghai Port F.C. players